Camanaú River is a river of Amazonas state in north-western Brazil, a tributary of the Curiuaú River.

Most of the river basin is in the  Waimiri Atroari Indigenous Territory.

See also
List of rivers of Amazonas

References

Sources

Rivers of Amazonas (Brazilian state)